Steven Lenhart (born August 28, 1986) is a former American soccer player.

Career

College and amateur
Lenhart grew up in Yorba Linda, California, and attended Esperanza High School.  He attended Point Loma Nazarene University for one year before transferring to Azusa Pacific University.  He tallied 38 goals and 12 assists in his 61 career collegiate games for Azusa Pacific, and was named a NAIA All-American in 2007. He was also named to the NAIA All-Tournament Team in 2006 and 2007, was honored as the NAIA Tournament's Outstanding Offensive Player in 2006 and 2007, and was MVP of the 2007 NAIA Tournament while helping lead Azusa Pacific to the 2007 NAIA national title over Concordia University, Irvine. During his college years, Lenhart also played for the Southern California Seahorses in the USL Premier Development League.

Professional

Lenhart was selected by the Columbus Crew as the 48th overall selection in the 2008 MLS SuperDraft. He made his MLS debut on May 31, 2008 as a second-half substitute against Chivas USA, and scored his first MLS goal on June 21, 2008, against Los Angeles Galaxy. His Rookie season ended with an MLS Championship.  Coach Sigi Schmid subbed Steven into the last 5 minutes to show his appreciation for the contribution to the Crew's winning season.

Outside of MLS league play Lenhart has proved himself a capable scorer, tallying 3 goals in the 2009–10 CONCACAF Champions League. He scored his first goal in the 58' minute in a 2 - 0 victory against the Puerto Rico Islanders, and claiming the other 2 goals in the 65' and 83' minute in a come from behind 2 - 2 draw against Mexican side Toluca.

Lenhart netted his first goal of the 2010-11 CONCACAF Champions League in the 79' minute in a 3-0 win over Joe Public F.C., making his total 4 goals in the Champions League thus far.

Lenhart also has 2 goals so far in the 2010 Lamar Hunt U.S. Open Cup, his first coming in the 94' minute against the Rochester Rhinos who knocked out the Columbus Crew from the tournament the previous year, his goal ended up being the game winner as the final score was 2 - 1 in favor of the Crew.

On January 13, 2011 Lenhart was traded to the San Jose Earthquakes along with allocation money in exchange for the #15 pick in the 2011 MLS SuperDraft. He signed a new contract with San Jose on November 30, 2011. His cry of "Goonies never say die!" led to the Earthquakes adopting the rally cry (in reference to the Goonies film) the next year.

After a brief stint with Japanese side FC Imabari, Lenhart announced his retirement from the game on May 2, 2017 due to the ongoing symptoms from concussion.

Personal life
Steven has two sisters, one brother, and a mother.  His father has died. The Lenharts were active in their community all through Steven's childhood involved in outreach and inclusion of the underrepresented. Service and action have been foundational cornerstones in Steven's life. To this day Steven serves on the board of Kickstart Joy, an organization formed by Mehdi Ballouchy to bring gear, expertise, and joy to Syrian refugee camps in Jordan. Steven is also involved with Soccer Without Borders, a soccer organization that provides a home base and a structure for refugee children in the U.S.

Steven now resides in Laguna Beach California and is a performance development coach to athletes and civilians alike incorporating a dynamic holistic approach.

In 2020, Lenhart participated in World's Toughest Race: Eco-Challenge Fiji.

Career statistics

Honors

Columbus Crew
Major League Soccer MLS Cup (1): 2008
Major League Soccer Supporter's Shield (2): 2008, 2009

San Jose Earthquakes
Major League Soccer Supporter's Shield: 2012

References

External links
 

1986 births
Living people
American soccer players
Point Loma Nazarene University alumni
Azusa Pacific Cougars men's soccer players
Southern California Seahorses players
Columbus Crew players
San Jose Earthquakes players
FC Imabari players
USL League Two players
Major League Soccer players
Japan Football League players
Columbus Crew draft picks
Soccer players from Florida
Association football forwards
American expatriate soccer players
Expatriate footballers in Japan
American expatriate sportspeople in Japan
Participants in American reality television series